Michael Ray "Jamike" Jarin is a Filipino basketball coach who is the interim head coach for the Phoenix Super LPG Fuel Masters of the PBA. He is also currently serving as assistant coach for UE Red Warriors.

He formerly coached the Ateneo Blue Eaglets and San Beda Red Lions, where he won several championships in both teams. He also served as head coach for NU Bulldogs from 2017 until 2019.

He also served as an assistant coach for PBA teams like Talk 'N Text Tropang Texters and Meralco Bolts.

Coaching record

Collegiate record

References 

Living people
TNT Tropang Giga coaches
Year of birth missing (living people)
Ateneo Blue Eagles men's basketball coaches
San Beda Red Lions basketball coaches
Meralco Bolts coaches
NU Bulldogs basketball coaches
Phoenix Super LPG Fuel Masters coaches
UE Red Warriors basketball coaches